Walk in da Park is the debut album by English rapper Giggs. It was released on 4 August 2008 independently through SN1 Records. It is Giggs' first commercial release after putting out a collection of mixtapes from 2005 onwards. The album includes guest appearances from SN1 members Joe Grind, Gunna, Kyze and Gunna D, among others. Production was handled by frequent in-house producers Boom Productions, Bayoz Muzik and others. Walk in da Park incorporates British hip hop with road rap and gangsta rap alongside aggressive flows and production.

The album entered the UK R&B Chart at number 13 and number 9 on the UK Independent Chart, selling thousands of independently-pressed copies and selling out in music stores. Walk in da Park was positively received by music critics.

Since its initial release, Walk in da Park has been recognised as an influential release for British hip hop, spawning the subgenre of road rap while introducing slower flows that contrasted the fast-paced grime flows that were significantly popular at the time.

Background
In 2007, Giggs released the song "Montague", leading to increased buzz for Giggs and his music. This was followed up by "Talkin' da Hardest", a freestyle over Stat Quo's song "Here We Go", produced by Dr. Dre. The freestyle and its music video proved to be an underground success and became a British rap cult classic. However, neither song were included in the track listing of the album. According to Giggs, Walk in da Park was recorded and completed within two weeks.

Giggs released a video for the song "Uummm!!" for promotion before the album was released, however MTV Base refused to play the video due to claims that the content was too strong for their channel. Radio channels also banned Giggs' music from airplay. In response to the bans, Giggs retracted his video application and wrote the tune "The Last Straw" directed towards the bad treatment he received from MTV Base and BBC Radio 1Xtra. When asked about the issue he said he was asked to censor "drug references" from the song, despite none being made.

DJs such as Tim Westwood are known to hold this album in high regard, despite Giggs being blacklisted from BBC 1Xtra.

The underground success of the album led to Giggs signing to XL Recordings, and the release of his sophomore album Let Em Ave It (2010).

Track listing

Personnel
Credits adapted from AllMusic.

 Giggs – primary artist, executive producer, composer
 Bayoz Muzik – producer
 Boost – featured artist, composer, engineer, mixing
 Carl "Universe" Dennis – executive producer, engineer, mixing
 Dubz – featured artist, composer
 Fix Dot'm – composer
 J Melo – featured artist, composer
 Joe Grind – featured artist, composer, engineer, mixing
 Killa Ki – featured artist, composer
 Kyze – featured artist, composer, engineer, mixing
 Chelsi Lauren – featured artist, composer
 O.T.B. – featured artist
 Buck – vocals 
 Fix Dot'M – vocals 
 Shocks – featured artist
 SN1 – featured artist
 Joe Grind – vocals 
 Kyzer – vocals 
 Gunna D – vocals 
 T.Boost – vocals 
 Wbeeza – producer
 Young Spray – featured artist, composer

Charts

References

2008 debut albums
Giggs (rapper) albums